Danielle Brittany Brooks (born September 17, 1989) is an American actress and singer. She is best known for her roles as Tasha "Taystee" Jefferson on the comedy-drama series Orange Is the New Black (2013–2019) and Leota Adebayo on the superhero series Peacemaker (2022–present). She received a Tony Award nomination for her portrayal of Sofia in the 2015 Broadway production of The Color Purple, and won the Grammy Award for Best Musical Theater Album for the film's accompanying album. 

In 2021, Brooks received a Primetime Emmy Award nomination for Outstanding Television Movie as an executive producer on Robin Roberts Presents: Mahalia.

Early life and education
Brooks was born in Augusta, Georgia, and grew up in South Carolina, in a Christian family; her father was a deacon, and her mother, a minister. She began acting at the age of six in a nativity play put on by her church. For her final two years of high school, she attended South Carolina Governor's School for the Arts & Humanities, a selective arts high school. She studied drama at the Juilliard School and graduated in 2011.

Career
After graduating from Juilliard, Brooks won roles in two theater productions: the Shakespeare Theatre Company's Servant of Two Masters, and Blacken the Bubble. She left both productions in 2013 to join the cast of the Netflix-produced television series Orange Is the New Black, a show about a women's prison, based on Piper Kerman's memoir of the same name. Brooks played as Tasha "Taystee" Jefferson. Her character originally was intended to be featured in the show for only two episodes, but was written into the rest of the first season and subsequent seasons. Taystee's onscreen best friend Poussey is played by Samira Wiley, with whom Brooks has been friends since they met while studying together at Juilliard. Brooks' performance on the show has been favorably reviewed by TV critics, with one writer calling her "the breakout actress of the show and one of the most refreshing and exciting new talents of 2013." Brooks was upgraded from a recurring cast member to a series regular for the show's second season. She competed against co-star Uzo Aduba in an episode of Spike's Lip Sync Battle that aired on June 28, 2017. Brooks won with performances of Ciara's "1, 2 Step" and Bon Jovi's "Livin' on a Prayer".

In September 2013, Brooks was cast in a third season episode of the HBO series Girls, becoming the first African-American actress on the show.

Brooks made her Broadway debut in the 2015 revival of The Color Purple as Sofia. The musical opened on December 10, 2015, at the Bernard B. Jacobs. Brooks received good notices for her performance, and received a nomination for the Tony Award for Best Featured Actress in a Musical. In June 2019, she played Beatrice in The Public Theater's production of Much Ado About Nothing, receiving a Drama League Award nomination for her performance.

In 2022, Brooks co-starred in James Gunn's Peacemaker television series alongside actor John Cena, playing the role of Leota Adebayo. The series is spin-off of Gunn's 2021 film The Suicide Squad, and is the first television series to be included in the DCEU. In an 2022 interview, Brooks revealed that Gunn was a big fan of the Netflix hit show Orange is the New Black, and wrote the part of Adebayo with her in mind.

It has also been announced that Brooks would star in a Broadway revival of August Wilson's The Piano Lesson starting on September 19, 2022 alongside Samuel L. Jackson and John David Washington and directed by LaTanya Richardson Jackson. It is also planned that this cast will then star in a film adaptation of the play, with a director still to be named. She will also appear in The Color Purple, a feature adaptation of the musical of the same name, directed by Blitz Bazawule.

From 2021 to 2022, Brooks voiced Lillie Carter-Grant, mother of protagonist Karma and doctor, in the animated series Karma's World.

Personal life
On July 2, 2019, Brooks announced that she was pregnant with her first child. In November, she gave birth to a girl. She is married to Dennis Gelin.

Filmography

Film

Television

Theatre

Awards and nominations

References

External links

Living people
1989 births
21st-century American actresses
African-American actresses
African-American Christians
Actresses from Augusta, Georgia
Actresses from Georgia (U.S. state)
Actresses from South Carolina
American musical theatre actresses
American television actresses
Grammy Award winners
Juilliard School alumni
Theatre World Award winners
20th-century African-American women singers
21st-century African-American women
21st-century African-American people